Pompilio Cacho Valerio (born 22 December 1976 in Tela) is a former Honduran football player who plays as forward.

Club career
A much-travelled striker, Cacho started his career at Marathón, making his debut on 2 December 1995 against Broncos, and then played for several clubs in Honduras, Guatemala and El Salvador. In Marathón, he is known as a legendary player for the club, scoring 56 goals during the 10 years he stayed with the team. His debut with Marathón was on December 2, 1995 in a 0–0 tie against Universidad in San Pedro Sula. With Marathón he won two league titles: 2001-02 Clausura and 2002-03 Clausura. In Summer 2009 he returned to Honduras after a few years abroad to play for Real Juventud. In December 2010, Pompigol rejoined Vida for 6 months. In January 2012 he returned to El Salvador to have a second spell with Vista Hermosa but that season ended in tears as Vista Hermosa was relegated.

International career
He made his debut for Honduras in a February 2003 UNCAF Nations Cup match against Costa Rica and has earned a total of 5 caps, scoring no goals. He has represented his country at the 2003 UNCAF Nations Cup.

His final international was a January 2004 friendly match against Norway.

Career statistic 
Last update: 26 May 2013

References

External links

1976 births
Living people
People from Tela
Association football midfielders
Honduran footballers
Honduras international footballers
C.D. Marathón players
F.C. Motagua players
C.D.S. Vida players
Deportivo Marquense players
Deportes Savio players
C.D. Vista Hermosa footballers
C.D. Luis Ángel Firpo footballers
C.D. Real Juventud players
Hispano players
Liga Nacional de Fútbol Profesional de Honduras players
Honduran expatriate footballers
Expatriate footballers in Guatemala
Expatriate footballers in El Salvador
Honduran expatriate sportspeople in Guatemala
Honduran expatriate sportspeople in El Salvador
2003 UNCAF Nations Cup players